Noel Vincent Burtt (10 November 1911 – 27 February 1983) was a cricketer who played nine matches of first-class cricket for Canterbury in New Zealand from 1937 to 1949.

Noel Burtt was a leg-spinner who spun the ball sharply and took about 500 wickets over 20 years for his club, Sydenham, in the Christchurch senior competition. However, he was only moderately successful in first-class cricket, and was unable to command a regular spot in the Canterbury team.

His brother Tom played Test cricket for New Zealand. Both of them played hockey for Canterbury, Tom also played hockey for New Zealand. Noel's son Wayne also played cricket for Canterbury. His nephew John Ward was a New Zealand Test wicket-keeper. His grandson Leighton Burtt played for Canterbury in first class, List A and Twenty20 formats.

Noel Burtt served in the New Zealand Artillery during the Second World War. In 1983, suffering from severe illness, he killed himself.

References

External links
 
 

1911 births
1983 suicides
New Zealand cricketers
Canterbury cricketers
Cricketers from Christchurch
New Zealand military personnel of World War II
South Island cricketers
Suicides in New Zealand